Stella Pepper Gyles House is a historic home located near Georgetown, Sussex County, Delaware.  It is dated to the mid-19th century, and is a large two-story, five bay, single-pile frame and shingle farmhouse with a three-bay side wing.  It has a small lean-to rear wing attached to the rear of the three-bay wing. At the front entrance is a one-story, one bay pedimented porch.  The house is constructed of cypress and is in a vernacular Greek Revival style.  Located on the property are a notable milk house, a mid-19th century barn, and a granary.

It was added to the National Register of Historic Places in 1979.

References

Houses on the National Register of Historic Places in Delaware
Greek Revival houses in Delaware
Houses in Georgetown, Delaware
National Register of Historic Places in Sussex County, Delaware